is a Japanese actor and illustrator. He is known for having roles in various tokusatsu series, most notably as Naoya Kaido in Kamen Rider 555 and Juzo Fuwa in Samurai Sentai Shinkenger.

Filmography

Film

TV Series

References

External links
Tokyo Village.net Official website

Living people
Japanese male actors
Kamen Rider
1977 births
Bunkyo University alumni